This is a list of mass shootings and shooting sprees in Canada. Shootings with 4 or more victims are included on this list, excluding perpetrators.

1900s

2000s

References 

Canada
Canada crime-related lists